Anavitrinella is a genus of moths in the family Geometridae erected by James Halliday McDunnough in 1922.

Species
 Anavitrinella addendaria (Grossbeck, 1908)
 Anavitrinella atristrigaria (Barnes & McDunnough, 1913)
 Anavitrinella ocularia (Barnes & McDunnough, 1917)
 Anavitrinella pampinaria (Guenée, 1857) - common gray

References

Boarmiini
Geometridae genera